Quinten is a hamlet situated on the north shore of the Walensee in Switzerland. It belongs to the municipality of Quarten. As there are no roads leading to Quinten, it is only reachable by boat or on foot.

Geography

Quinten consists of two main villages (Quinten and Au) and a large number of weekend houses that can be found throughout the villages. Au is the smaller of the two parts of Quinten and lies about one kilometer to the east of the main village.
Quinten is an incredibly steep part of Switzerland and reaches from 419m above sea level (mean level of the Walensee) to 2193m above sea level. The horizontal distance between the main village and Schären (highest point) is about 2 kilometers.
The rock in and around Quinten mainly consists of limestone which is responsible for the near-vertical cliffs towering above Quinten.
Due to the sheltered location at the foot of the Churfirsten mountain range, Quinten has one of the mildest climates known north of the alps. This is an important factor in the local wine growing industry.

History

The name of the hamlet probably goes back to early medieval times and the administration of the bishopric of Chur. It follows the pattern of other villages along the Walensee which are called Terzen and Quarten (based on Latin ordinal numbers, tertius, quartus, quintus).

The hamlet of Quinten belonged to the Abbey in Pfäffers from the 9th century AD before it became part of the Austrian dominion of Windegg. After 1438 it became part of the Gaster.

The small local church was built in 1765. It contains some 20th-century frescos.

In 1807 the then well-known civil servant and politician Johann Melchior Kubli moved to Quinten and the stately house to the west of the village that is still known as the Kublihaus. Kubli is primarily remembered for his role in the witch hunt process against one Anna Göldi in 1782. The secret process which was outrageous even by the standards of 1782, ended in the execution of the victim. Kubli is believed to have passed on secret documents regarding this process to German journalists who proceeded to publish them and caused a public outcry that was heard throughout most of Europe at the time.

In the 19th and 20th century, Quinten did not change much, as the absence of road connections made industrialization and commerce very difficult. One major change was the construction of the walking track that connects Quinten and Au in the early 20th century which made the life of the children of Au much easier, as they no longer had to climb steeply up and then down into Quinten, but could use the lovely and flat new track on their way to school. In the early 1930s it looked like Quinten's fate was about to change, when the construction of a road from Weesen at the western end to Walenstadt at the eastern end of the Walensee was discussed. Two projects were discussed, one along the northern side of the lake through Quinten, the other along the southern side. In the end the road was built on the southern side and Quinten was left to stay the quiet place it still is. 
In the 1950s electrical mains power reached Quinten which led to the arrival of weekenders who built their houses in Quinten starting around the same time. In 1960 the excursion boat service took up its operation. The village school ceased to exist in 1972.

Economy

Agriculture, dominated by vineyards, is still an important factor in Quinten's economy. The locally grown wines, predominantly Pinot Noir which accounts for about 75% of the total harvest, enjoy a very good reputation among connoisseurs. Other varieties grown in Quinten include: Pinot Blanc, Baco Noir, Chardonnay, Chasselas, Merlot, Seyval Blanc and Syrah. In 2008 vineyards covered more than 76000 square meters, and more than 47 tonnes of grapes were harvested. Other forms of farming are on the retreat though, as the very steep terrain makes agricultural work very hard.
Thanks to the mild climate, exotic fruit, like figs and kiwifruit, thrive in Quinten in a way that is unique north of the alps. These crops, however, are of little economic value and are mainly grown for the use of the locals.
 
Tourism and transport are two other major sources of income for the local population.

The population was 41 as of 2008.

Books about Quinten

Quinten plays the starring role in the crime novel below. The book is only available in German.
https://web.archive.org/web/20070822111620/http://www.orteverlag.ch/pages/krimis/mord_am_walensee.htm

A book about local events throughout most of the 20th century. The book is only available in German.
https://web.archive.org/web/20110706222740/http://www.buecher.ch/suchergebnisse.html?pd=6565550

References

External links

Villages in the canton of St. Gallen
Populated places on the Walensee